Besuki is the name of a district (kecamatan) in Situbondo Regency, East Java, Indonesia with an area of 26.08 km2. In 2004, its population was 57,109 people. In ancient time the city was important because it was the capital of the Residency of Besuki.

During Majapahit Kingdom, Besuki was already a growing area and was known by the name Keta.  The town revolted along with Sadeng against the Majapahit Empire but was extinguished by Gajah Mada. This event occurred in the year 1331 CE.

Villages
 Kalimas
 Widoropayung
 Bloro
 Besuki
 Demung
 Jetis
 Langkap
 Pesisir
 Blimbing
 Sumberejo

External links
 Statistik kecamatan Besuki, Situbondo

Districts of East Java
Situbondo Regency